The 2021 African Artistic Gymnastics Championships took place on May 26–27 in Cairo, Egypt.  It served as an Olympic qualification event for four individual Olympic berths.

Medal winners

Olympic berths 
Egyptian athletes Omar Mohamed and Zeina Ibrahim won the competition and qualified for the 2020 Olympic Games.  Although athletes from Egypt finished top two for both men and women, they could only earn one Olympic berth for each.  As a result, Uche Eke of Nigeria and Naveen Daries of South Africa also qualified for the Olympic Games.  In doing so, Eke became the first gymnast from Nigeria to qualify for the Olympic Games and Mohamed became the first Egyptian male.

Results

Women's all-around

Men's all-around

References

Africa
Sports competitions in Cairo
International sports competitions hosted by Egypt
African Artistic Gymnastics Championships
African Artistic Gymnastics Championships
African Artistic Gymnastics Championships